Grahamdale is a rural municipality in the province of Manitoba in Western Canada. It lies in the Interlake Region. It was incorporated as a Local Government District (LGD) on 1 January 1945, and became a Rural Municipality in 1997.

The municipality exists in two sections that are separated by a part of the Fairford 50 Indian reserve. It extends from Gypsumville to Mulvihill and incorporates the former RM of Woodlea within its present boundaries.

Communities
 Camper
 Faulkner
 Grahamdale
 Gypsumville
 Hilbre
 Moosehorn
 Mulvihill
 St. Martin
 St. Martin Junction
 Spearhill
 Steep Rock

Demographics 

References 

 Geographic Names of Manitoba (pg. 97) - the Millennium Bureau of Canada
 Manitoba Historical Society - Manitoba Municipalities: Rural Municipality of Grahamdale
 Map of Grahamdale R.M. at Statcan

External links
 Official website

Grahamdale